Tiago Galletto López (born 11 May 2002) is a Uruguayan professional footballer who plays as a midfielder for Primera División club Cerro Largo on loan from River Plate Montevideo.

Career
A youth academy graduate of River Plate Montevideo, Galletto made his professional debut on 5 September 2020 in club's 2–0 league win against Montevideo Wanderers.

Career statistics

Club

References

External links
 

2002 births
Living people
Association football midfielders
Uruguayan footballers
Uruguayan Primera División players
Club Atlético River Plate (Montevideo) players